Stadion Panayot Volov is a multi-use stadium in Shumen, Bulgaria. It is used mostly for football matches and is the home ground of Volov Shumen. The stadium currently holds a license for 3,500 spectators.

References

Football venues in Bulgaria
Sport in Shumen
Buildings and structures in Shumen